Masahiro Miki (born July 26, 1955) is a Japanese billionaire businessman, and the founder and largest shareholder of Tokyo-based shoemaker ABC-Mart. Miki is of Korean descent.

In 1985, Miki founded shoe and apparel company Kokusai Boeki Shoji. The company was renamed ABC-Mart in 1990 and went public in 2002. Miki acted as chairman of the company from 2004 to 2007.

As of December 2018, Miki has an estimated net worth of $3.4 billion.

References

Japanese billionaires
Living people
21st-century Japanese businesspeople
People from Ise, Mie
1955 births